Svechnikov is a Russian masculine surname derived from the word свечник (svechnik, meaning "chandler"). Its feminine counterpart is Svechnikova. It may refer to:
Anastasiya Svechnikova (born 1992), Uzbekistani javelin thrower
Andrei Svechnikov (born 2000), Russian ice hockey forward 
Evgeny Svechnikov (born 1996), Russian ice hockey forward 
Mikhail Svechnikov (1882–1938), Russian military officer

See also
Sveshnikov

Russian-language surnames